Brendan Lambe (born December 19, 2004) is an American professional soccer player who plays as a midfielder for USL Championship side Atlanta United 2.

Club career
Born in Apex, North Carolina, Lambe began playing competitive soccer with the Capital Area RailHawks in 2016 before joining North Carolina FC youth in 2017. Lambe then joined the Atlanta United FC academy in 2019.

On September 16, 2020, Lambe made his professional debut for Atlanta United 2, Atlanta United's reserve team, against the Tampa Bay Rowdies. Lambe started the match and played 53 minutes as Atlanta United 2 lost 2–1.

Career statistics

Club

References

2004 births
Living people
American soccer players
Association football midfielders
Atlanta United 2 players
USL Championship players
Soccer players from North Carolina
People from Apex, North Carolina